The Legitimation of Power by David Beetham is a famous political theory text. The book examines the legitimation of power as an essential issue for social scientists to take into account, looking at both relationships between legitimacy and the variety of contemporary political systems.

Notability 
It has been praised by David Held in the Times Higher Education Supplement as an "admirable text", "far reaching in its scope" and "extraordinary in the clarity with which it covers a wide range of material".  "One can have nothing but the highest regard for this volume." It has also been praised by Zygmunt Bauman in the journal Sociology who argues that it is "a study bound to revolutionize sociological thinking and teaching", that it is "seminal and profoundly original" and that it "should become the obligitory reading for every teacher and practitioner of social science."

Structure of the book 
The book is in two parts. The first looks at the criteria for legitimacy, outlining the social-scientific concept of legitimacy, power and its need of legitimation, the intellectual structure of legitimacy generally and the social science and the social construction of legitimacy in particular. The second part of the work examines the legitimacy of the contemporary states, outlining the dimensions of state legitimacy, the tendencies of political systems to have crisis and various modes of non-legitimate power. This part concludes with a look at legitimacy in both political science and political philosophy.

A problem with "legitimacy" that this work, according to Steffek, clearly emphasises is that the term is used both prescriptively and descriptively. From the prescriptive point of view social scientists should be able to suggest when governance deserves to be described as legitimate. From the descriptive point of view social scientists should be able to suggest why those subjected to governance agree  to  accept and support, or reject, it. As for the first project, there is a well-established strand of normative research that discusses a prescriptive version of legitimacy.

The book's details 
David Beetham (1991) The Legitimation of Power, Palgrave Macmillan 9780333375396

References 

1991 non-fiction books
Sociology books
Political books
Books in political philosophy